The Kalkkögel are a mountain chain that is part of the Stubai Alps in Tyrol, Austria. The name is plural.

Geology  
The Kalkkögel consist of Mesozoic sediments, like those that occur elsewhere in the  Stubai Alps, west of the Wipptal valley, around the Serles crest or in the area of the Tribulaune. In the region of the Kalkkögel, there are sediments from the  boundary of the Permian-Triassic to the Norian of the upper Triassic, which lie on its crystalline bedrock. 

For the most part, however, these sediments consist of dolomites of the middle and upper Triassic. These dolomites are separated into a lower and upper dolomite by a ten-metre-thick band of slightly metamorphosed slates, the so-called Raibler beds. 

Although this layer is thin, it produces a clear morphological division. At the bottom of the Mesozoic sediments is a sequence of conglomerates and sandstones. 

In this layer, which is at most a few tens of metres thick, are iron ore deposits, the most important of which were quarried south of the Burgstall and was the basis of the tool industry in the Stubaital that still exists today. The external appearance of the Kalkkögel resembles the Dolomites, which is why they are often referred to as "North Tyrolean Dolomites".

Individual peaks in the Kalkkögel
Saile
Ampferstein
Marchreisenspitze
Malgrubenspitze
Hochtennspitze
Steingrubenwand und Schlicker Zinnen
Steingrubenkogel
Kleine Ochsenwand
Große Ochsenwand
Riepenwand
Schlicker Seespitze
Widdersberg
Schneiderspitze
Hoher Burgstall
Niederer Burgstall

References

Literature

External links 

 Geology of the Kalkkögel at senderswind.at 

Mountain ranges of the Alps
Stubai Alps
Mountain ranges of Tyrol (state)